Pseudofornicia is a genus of braconid wasps in the family Braconidae. There are at least four described species in Pseudofornicia, found in Australasia.

Species
These four species belong to the genus Pseudofornicia:
 Pseudofornicia commoni (Austin & Dangerfield, 1992) (Australia)
 Pseudofornicia flavoabdominis (He & Chen, 1994) (China)
 Pseudofornicia nigrisoma van Achterberg & Long, 2015 (Vietnam)
 Pseudofornicia vanachterbergi Long, 2015 (Vietnam)

References

Microgastrinae